Mary Lake is a small freshwater man-made lake in Redding, California. It is located near the Mary Lake Subdivision on the west side of Redding off Buenaventura Boulevard. Its inflow and outflow is Jenny Creek, which flows into the Sacramento River.

Mary Lake was previously known as Falks Lake.

Ecology
In 2001 the City of Redding lowered the lake, removed 2/3 of the dead trees and added microbes that compete naturally with algae growth, restoring the water to its picturesque appearance of years ago. In 2009, as many as five beaver living in the lake and Jenny Creek were violently killed, perhaps by rock throwing youths.

See also
List of lakes in California

References

Reservoirs in Shasta County, California
Redding, California
Reservoirs in California
Reservoirs in Northern California